Nacer Chadli (born 2 August 1989) is a Belgian professional footballer who currently plays as a winger for Belgian First Division A club K.V.C. Westerlo on loan from Turkish Super Lig club İstanbul Başakşehir and the Belgium national team.

He began his career in the Eerste Divisie with AGOVV Apeldoorn, and in 2010, he was transferred to top-flight FC Twente, where he won the KNVB Cup in his first season. In 2013, Chadli joined Tottenham Hotspur, and three years later he signed for West Bromwich Albion for a club record £13 million.

Chadli played internationally for Morocco in 2010 as his father is of Moroccan descent, but switched allegiance to Belgium the following year. He has earned over sixty caps for Belgium and represented the nation at the FIFA World Cup in 2014 and 2018, as well as at UEFA Euro 2020.

Club career

Apeldoorn
Chadli played his youth football at JS Thier-à-Liège, Standard Liège and MVV Maastricht.
In the summer of 2007, he was contracted by Dutch second division club AGOVV Apeldoorn, who scouted him at MVV's youth academy. Here he was considered an emerging talent. While Chadli was being tested by AGOVV, he went under the alias "Kaliffe", because technical manager Ted van Leeuwen was afraid other clubs would show their interest. Chadli scored his first goal in professional football for AGOVV in a match against FC Volendam.

Twente

In the summer of 2010, Chadli signed with FC Twente, and in the ensuing season became a first team player for the then reigning Eredivisie champions.
His first Eredivisie goal was the winning one away at title rivals PSV.
He made his European and Champions League debut in a 2–2 home draw against Internazionale on 14 September in the competition's group stage.
On 29 September, he scored his first Champions League goal away at Tottenham Hotspur (4–1), and on 2 November scored his second at Werder Bremen in a 0–2 away victory. He later scored again in the Champions League against Tottenham from a free-kick on 7 December, the goal securing a draw for Twente at home, 3–3.

Tottenham Hotspur

On 21 July 2013, Tottenham Hotspur agreed a deal with Twente to sign Chadli for a transfer fee of £7 million. The club confirmed that subject to agreement of personal terms and a medical, Chadli would join the Spurs squad for pre-season training in Hong Kong. On 23 July, the club confirmed that Chadli had joined the squad which was participating in training sessions prior to the club taking part in the 2013 Premier League Asia Trophy. Chadli finally agreed terms on 26 July and became an official Tottenham player, later making his Spurs debut in a 5–2 friendly defeat to AS Monaco on 3 August. He made his Premier League debut on 18 August, the first match of the 2013–14 season, against Crystal Palace in a 1–0 win, then scored his first Premier League goal on 12 February 2014, a 0–4 win away to Newcastle United.

On 24 August 2014, the second matchday of the 2014–15 season, Chadli scored twice as Tottenham defeated Queens Park Rangers 4–0 at home. This was the start of a run of good form for Chadli, who went on to score several goals, including one against Tottenham's North London rivals Arsenal. The run of form, however, was cut short by injury, and before he could return to form, tragedy struck his family after his father died. Chadli slowly returned to form, scoring two goals in two matches against Newcastle United and Southampton, respectively, in late April to take his season total to 12, ten in the Premier League. Chadli increased his tally to 11 Premier League goals by rounding the goalkeeper in a 2–0 victory against Hull City on 16 May 2015.

West Bromwich Albion
On 29 August 2016, West Bromwich Albion agreed a deal with Tottenham Hotspur to sign Chadli for a club-record transfer fee of £13 million. He made his debut in a 1–0 defeat to Bournemouth. Chadli scored twice and got two assists on his home debut, only his second league appearance for the club which ended as a 4–2 win over West Ham United.

In 2017–18, Chadli was troubled by recurring thigh injuries and made only three appearances by the end of April in a West Bromwich Albion side that was eventually relegated.  Totalling five appearances, he scored once, a free kick in a 1–1 draw at Leicester City on 16 October 2017.

Monaco
On 30 August 2018, Monaco announced the signing of Chadli on a three-year deal. They paid more than €12 million to West Bromwich Albion to secure the services of the multipurpose midfielder. At the club he was united with fellow Belgium national team player, Youri Tielemans. Chadli competed in the Champions League with Monaco. In Ligue 1, however, he had an unsuccessful season, as Monaco struggled against relegation from the league throughout the competition, only securing it at the end of the season. At Monaco, Chadli played only 1,058 minutes and neither scored a goal or made an assist in all competitions.

Loan to Anderlecht
On 11 August 2019, Chadli joined Anderlecht on a season-long loan from Monaco after having been sidetracked at the French club. Player-manager Vincent Kompany was able to persuade Chadli in coming to the Belgian First Division A. After Kompany and Simon Mignolet, he was the third Belgian international to return to Belgium to play. Anderlecht took over his entire contract (more than € 230,000 gross per month) from Chadli at Monaco. With the experienced Chadli, and a number of other experienced signings, Anderlecht wanted to invest to lift their youngsters to a higher level.

On 17 August 2019, he made his debut for Anderlecht in a 4–2 loss to Kortrijk. The match also marked his debut in the highest Belgian division, which he had left at the age of 17. Despite his injury problems, Chadli was one of the highlights of the club that season. He managed to score eight goals and give five assists in 17 league appearances. However, Anderlecht did not sign him on a permanent deal as the loan expired, as the club did not have the finances.

İstanbul Başakşehir
On 10 September 2020, Chadli moved to Turkish club Istanbul Basaksehir. He signed a two-year contract with the club, and was assigned jersey number 11. Başakşehir were the defending Süper Lig champions and had thus qualified directly for the group stage of the Champions League. At the point of signing, he still had one year left of his deal with Monaco, but did not have any prospects of playing time there. At the club, he was reunited with a number of fellow former Premier League players, including Martin Škrtel and Demba Ba.

On 8 November, Chadli made his first appearance for Başakşehir, in a league match against Gençlerbirliği, after having been injured during the first two months of his tenure at the club. He came on as a substitute for Deniz Türüç in the 79th minute, as Başakşehir were down 0–1. Chadli went on to contribute heavily to his club's win, giving two assists as the team turned around the game to secure a 2–1.

Loan to K.V.C. Westerlo
On 6 September 2022, Chadli joined Belgian First Division A club K.V.C. Westerlo on a season-long loan.

International career

A dual citizen of Belgium and Morocco, Chadli was thus able to represent either nation. He made his debut for Morocco on 17 November 2010, in a 1–1 friendly draw against Northern Ireland at Windsor Park, and was named man of the match. On 28 January 2011, however, he announced his intention to represent Belgium at the international level, which was permitted because he had not yet played in a competitive match for Morocco. He made his debut for the Belgian squad for a 9 February friendly match against Finland.

Chadli has played as a striker for the Belgium national team, scoring his first international goal in a UEFA Euro 2012 qualifier against Azerbaijan in the King Baudouin Stadium in Brussels on 29 March 2011.

On 26 May 2014, Chadli scored what would have been his third international goal in a pre-2014 World Cup friendly against Luxembourg. The match, however, was later recognised invalid as coach Marc Wilmots had made seven substitutions instead of the permitted six.

On 13 May 2014, Chadli was named to Belgium's squad for the 2014 World Cup. He started in midfield but was substituted at half time for Dries Mertens in the team's first game of the tournament, a 2–1 win over Algeria in Belo Horizonte.

In May 2018 he was named to Belgium’s preliminary squad for the 2018 FIFA World Cup in Russia.

On 2 July 2018, Chadli came off the bench to score the winning goal in injury time to lift Belgium to a 3–2 victory over Japan in the round of 16 of the 2018 FIFA World Cup. The goal is chosen by the BBC panel as goal of the tournament in the 2018 World Cup.

Style of play
Chadli is a versatile midfielder who can play as an attacking midfielder, in a number 10 role, or as a winger on either flank. He is comfortable on both feet and has a good shot at his disposal.

Career statistics

Club

International

Scores and results list Belgium's goal tally first.

Honours
Twente
KNVB Cup: 2010–11
Johan Cruyff Shield: 2011

Tottenham Hotspur
Football League Cup runner-up: 2014–15

Belgium
FIFA World Cup third place: 2018

References

External links

1989 births
Living people
Footballers from Liège
Citizens of Morocco through descent
Moroccan footballers
Morocco international footballers
Belgium international footballers
Dual internationalists (football)
Belgian footballers
Belgian sportspeople of Moroccan descent
MVV Maastricht players
AGOVV Apeldoorn players
FC Twente players
Tottenham Hotspur F.C. players
West Bromwich Albion F.C. players
AS Monaco FC players
R.S.C. Anderlecht players
İstanbul Başakşehir F.K. players
Eredivisie players
Eerste Divisie players
Premier League players
Ligue 1 players
Belgian expatriate footballers
Expatriate footballers in the Netherlands
Belgian expatriate sportspeople in the Netherlands
Expatriate footballers in England
Belgian expatriate sportspeople in England
Expatriate footballers in Monaco
Belgian expatriate sportspeople in Monaco
Expatriate footballers in Turkey
Association football wingers
2014 FIFA World Cup players
2018 FIFA World Cup players
UEFA Euro 2020 players
Belgian expatriate sportspeople in Turkey